

Extent 

The government of Cyprus has in theory made some progress in fighting against corruption, and one of them is the amendment to its Criminal Code in 2012 which provides the Criminal Law Convention on Corruption. The strong and independent judicial system is able to ensure the protection of property rights; therefore, foreign investors do not consider corruption a pressing issue for doing business in Cyprus. However, a whistleblower protection law is needed in the country in order to ensure an effective anti-corruption measure. It is also important to note that money-laundering remains a serious problem in the country. In addition, corruption scandals involving politicians from major political parties are not uncommon and when these get uncovered, little to no effort in taken to pursue them.  The usual “defense” employed by accused politicians, involves official statements indicating that “they know too much” and if their case is pursued, they will uncover dirt involving other political party members.  

Transparency International's 2021 Corruption Perception Index ranks the country in 52nd place out of 180 countries in the Index, on a scale where the lowest-ranked countries are perceived to have the most honest public sector. Transparency International's 2013 Global Corruption Barometer report shows that 72% of respondents believe that level of corruption increased in Cyprus

See also
Cyprus
Police corruption in Cyprus

References

External links
Cyprus Corruption Profile from the Business Anti-Corruption Portal

Corruption in Europe
Crime in Cyprus by type